Darryl Hickie (born ) is a Canadian politician. He was elected to represent the electoral district of Prince Albert Carlton in the Legislative Assembly of Saskatchewan in the 2007 election. He is a member of the Saskatchewan Party.

Hickie was born in Winnipeg into a military family, and moved to Prince Albert in 1975. He worked as a correctional officer and parole officer at the Saskatchewan Federal Penitentiary, and later as a police officer for the Prince Albert Police Service.

He was appointed to the Executive Council of Saskatchewan as Minister of Corrections, Public Safety and Policing in Brad Wall's government in November 2007.

In 2020, he ran for mayor of Prince Albert, but finished second to incumbent mayor, Greg Dionne.

References

External links
Darry Hickie Official Site

Saskatchewan Party MLAs
Living people
Canadian prison officers
Canadian police officers
Members of the Executive Council of Saskatchewan
Politicians from Prince Albert, Saskatchewan
Politicians from Winnipeg
21st-century Canadian politicians
Year of birth uncertain
Year of birth missing (living people)